Leader Airport  is located  southeast of Leader, Saskatchewan, Canada.

See also 
List of airports in Saskatchewan

References

External links 
Page about this airport on COPA's Places to Fly airport directory

Registered aerodromes in Saskatchewan
Happyland No. 231, Saskatchewan